The 2009 Barum Czech Rally Zlín was 8th round of 2009 Intercontinental Rally Challenge season, it was won by local driver Jan Kopecký with Škoda Fabia S2000.

Results

Special stages

References 

Zlin
Rally Zlin
Barum Rally Zlín